MI-7, MI7, MI 7 or variant may mean:

 MI7, British Military Intelligence Section 7
 Mil Mi-7 a.k.a. Mil V-7
 Michigan's 7th congressional district
 M-7 (Michigan highway) 
Mission: Impossible – Dead Reckoning Part One, an upcoming spy-thriller film starring Tom Cruise